Leulinghen-Bernes is a commune in the Pas-de-Calais department in the Hauts-de-France region of France.

Geography
The A16 autoroute cuts through the middle of the commune's territory.

Population

Places of interest
 The church of St.Leger, dating from the fourteenth century.
At the end of the XIV th century, The french-english border crossed the center of the church. There were two entrance doors: the northern one for the subject of the english king, and the south one for the subjects of the french king.

See also
Communes of the Pas-de-Calais department

References

Leulinghenbernes